The Barotac Nuevo Plaza Field is a football venue in Barotac Nuevo, Iloilo. The field is located at the town plaza. The football field was one of the two venues of the 2008 AFC Challenge Cup qualifiers held in the Philippines along with the Iloilo Sports Complex.

References

Buildings and structures in Iloilo
Football venues in the Philippines
Sports in Iloilo